Yeh Hai Mohabbatein ( This is love) is an Indian romantic drama TV series, which aired from 3 December 2013 to 18 December 2019 on Star Plus. Produced by Ekta Kapoor under Balaji Telefilms, it starred Divyanka Tripathi and Karan Patel as Ishita Iyer and Raman Bhalla. The story was initially based on Manju Kapur's 2011 novel Custody.

Plot
Set in Delhi, the show revolves around two neighbours, Tamil dentist Dr. Ishita Iyer and Punjabi CEO Raman Kumar Bhalla; neighbours who got off on the wrong foot and dislike each other, but are brought together by destiny and their mutual love for Ruhi, Raman's daughter from his ex-wife Shagun.

Following the betrayal of being left for a richer man, Raman loses trust in relationships and love. Shagun and Raman's son, Aditya, is brainwashed by Ashok who is the new man in Shagun's life. This makes it difficult for Raman to establish a relationship with Aditya. Raman also finds it hard to connect with his daughter, Ruhi, who was only 6 months old when Shagun left him.

Ishita who loves children, but cannot conceive due to a medical problem develops a deep connection with Ruhi.

Initially, Raman and Ishita hate each other due to several misunderstandings. However, they enter into a marriage of convenience for Ruhi's sake. Raman marries Ishita in order to get Ruhi's custody while Ishita marries him to give Ruhi the motherly love she was deprived of.

After marrying each other, Raman and Ishita realize how wrong their misconceptions about each other were. Their misunderstandings slowly fade away and they become friends. Ishita supports Raman in moving on from his past and brings him closer to Ruhi. Raman supports Ishita against his entire family when she gets framed by Raman's brother-in-law, Parmeet Khurana and proves her innocence. He doesn't step back from sacrificing his prestigious position as the president of "New Delhi Entrepreneurs Association" in order to get back Ishita's dental license that was unfairly snatched away from her by Ashok and his brother, Sooraj. Raman supports Ishita's family when in need and wins her heart in the process. Eventually Aditya also understands Raman and Ishita's love for him and joins the family.

Raman and Ishita's marriage eventually blossoms into true love and both of them gain true companionship for life. The rest of the story follows how Raman and Ishita face numerous challenges thrown by destiny, and yet remain together and strengthen their bond.

Cast

Main
Divyanka Tripathi Dahiya as Dr. Ishita Iyer Bhalla: A dentist; Vishwanathan and Madhavi's younger daughter; Vandita's sister; Mihika's cousin; Raman's second wife; Aditya,Yug and Ruhi's Adoptive Mother ;  Pihu's mother ; Jr. Aditya's adoptive grandmother.  (2013-2019)
Karan Patel as Raman Kumar Bhalla: Omprakash and Santoshi's elder son; Romesh, Simran and Rinki's brother; Shagun's ex-husband; Ishita's husband; Aditya, Ruhi,  and Pihu Father. Yug adoptive father Jr,Aditya grandfather.

Aditi Bhatia as Ruhi Bhalla Srivastava: Raman and Shagun's Daughter : Ishita's Adoptive Daughter ; Aditya's Sister , Half - Sister of Yug and Pihu ; Karan's wife. (2016-2019)
Ruhanika Dhawan as 
Child Ruhi Bhalla (2013-2016)
Pihu Bhalla: Raman and Ishita's younger daughter-youngest half sister of Aditya,Yug,and Ruhi. (2016-2019)
Abhishek Verma as 
Aditya "Adi" Bhalla: Raman and Shagun's son ; Ruhi's Brother and eldest Half brother of Pihu and Yug ;Roshni's husband; Ashok's Adoptive son ; Jr. Aditya's father (2016-2018) (Dead)
Gautam Ahuja as Child Aditya Bhalla (2013-2016)
Yug Bhalla: Aditya's lookalike; Raman and Ishita's adopted son , - younger half adopted brother of Aditya.elder half adopted brother of Ruhi,and Pihu.Aliya's husband. (2018-2019)
Krishna Mukherjee as Aliya Raghav Bhalla: Mani and Shagun's niece/adoptive daughter; Rohan's and Aditya's ex-wife; Yug's wife. (2016-2019)

Recurring
Anita Hassanandani Reddy as Shagun Arora Raghav/Bhalla: Mihir and Sanjana's sister; Raman's ex-wife; Ashok's ex-fiancée and Girlfriend; Mani's wife; Aditya and Ruhi's mother; Aliya's aunt/adoptive mother; Pihu's surrogate mother; Jr. Aditya's grandmother. (2013-2019)
Sumeeet Sachdev as Abhimanyu "Mani" Raghav: Shobhna's son; Upamanyu's brother; Ishita's childhood friend; Shagun's husband; Aliya's uncle/adoptive father. (2014–2019)
Prakash: Abhimanyu's look-alike
Abhay Bhargava as Vishwanathan "Vishwa" Iyer: Madhavi's husband; Vandita and Ishita's father; Mihika's uncle; Shravan, Kshitija and Pihu's grandfather; Aditya, Ruhi and Yug's adoptive grandfather. (2013–2019)
Neena Kulkarni as Madhavi "Madhu" Iyer: Vishwanathan's wife; Vandita and Ishita's mother; Mihika's aunt; Shravan, Kshitija and Pihu's grandmother; Aditya, Ruhi and Yug's adoptive grandmother. (2013–2019)
Kaushal Kapoor as Omprakash Bhalla: Santoshi's husband; Raman, Romesh, Simran and Rinki's father; Aditya, Yug, Ruhi, Pihu and Ananya's grandfather; Yug's adoptive grandfather; Jr. Aditya's great-grandfather. (2013–2019)
Shahnaz Rizwan / Usha Rana as Santoshi "Toshi" Bhalla: Omprakash's wife; Raman, Romesh, Simran and Rinki's mother; Aditya, Yug, Ruhi, Pihu and Ananya's grandmother; Yug's adoptive grandmother; Jr. Aditya's great-grandmother (2013–2019)
Sangram Singh as Ashok Khanna: Sooraj's brother; Mihika's ex-husband; Shagun's ex-fiancé and Boyfriend, Aditya's Foster Father ,  Ishita and Raman's Rival and Later friend(2013–2018)
Shruti Bapna as Vandita "Vandu" Iyer Chandran: Madhavi and Vishwanathan's elder daughter; Ishita's sister; Mihika's cousin; Bala's first wife; Shravan and Kshitija's mother (2013–2017) (Dead)
Pankaj Bhatia as Bala Chandran: Devyani's elder son; Subramaniam's brother; Vandita's widower; Kiran's husband; Shravan and Kshitija's father. (2013–2019)
Amita Yadav as Kiran Chandran: Bala's second wife; Shravan and Kshitija's adoptive mother. (2017–2019)
Mihir Arora as Shravan Chandran: Vandita and Bala's son; Kiran's adoptive son; Kshitija's brother (2016–2018)
Bhavesh Jaiswal as Child Shravan Chandran (2013-2016)
Aly Goni as Romesh "Romi" Bhalla: Omprakash and Santoshi's younger son; Raman, Simran and Rinki's brother; Sarika's ex-husband; Mihika's husband. (2013–2019)
Mihika Verma / Avantika Hundal as Mihika Iyer Khanna/Bhalla: Madhavi and Vishwanthan's niece; Vandita and Ishita's cousin; Ashok's ex-wife; Romesh's wife. (2013-2019)
Shireen Mirza as Simran "Simmi" Bhalla: Omprakash and Santoshi's elder daughter; Raman, Romesh and Rinky's sister; Param's ex-wife; Ananya's mother. (2013–2019)
Anurag Sharma as Parmeet "Param" Khurana: Simmi's ex-husband; Ananya's father , Ashok and Sooraj's Friend. (2013–2019)
Kavya Ramnani as Ananya Khurana: Simran and Param's daughter (2016-2017) (Dead)
Raj Singh Arora as Mihir Arora: Shagun and Sanjana's brother; Mihika's ex-boyfriend and fiance; Rinki's widower (2013-2016)
Resha Konkar as Rinky Bhalla Arora: Omprakash and Santoshi's younger daughter; Raman, Simran and Romesh's sister; Mihir's wife (2013–2015) (Dead)
Anjali Ujawane as Devyani Chandran: Bala and Subramaniam's mother; Shravan and Kshtija's grandmother (2013–2017)
Neeru Agarwal as Neelu: Bhalla's housekeeper (2013–2018)
Sweety Walia as Pammi Mehra: Santosh's friend (2013–2018)
Deep Jaitley as Prateek: Ishita's former fiancé (2013–2014)
Yukti Kapoor as Mayura Dunavati: Ishita's colleague (2013)
Shakti Arora as Ishita's suitor (2013)
Arti Singh as Kriti: Ishita's college friend (2013)
Vineet Kumar Chaudhary as Sooraj Kumar Khanna: Ashok's brother (2014-2018)
Sareeka Dhillon as Sarika Bhalla: Romi's former wife; Abhishek's sister (2014–2016)
Neel Motwani as Advocate Neel Pathak: Bhalla family's lawyer; Trisha's fiancé (2014–2016)
Garima Jain as Trisha Tandon: Rajeev's sister; Mihir's former fiancée; Neel's fiancé (2014)
Gaurav Nanda as Rajeev Tandon: Trisha's brother; Raman's investor (2014–2015)
Arshima Thapar as Sanjana Arora: Shagun and Mihir's sister (2014)
Bhanujeet Sudan / Amit Tandon as Subramaniam "Subbu" Chandran: Devayani's younger son; Bala's brother; Ishita's ex-lover; Lakshmi's husband. (2013-2015)
Shahina Surve as Lakshmi Chandran: Subramaniam's wife. (2015)
Karishma Sharma as Raina: Bala's blackmailer (2014)
Vivek Dahiya as Inspector Abhishek Singh: Sarika's brother; Divya's fiancé (2015-2017)
Hargun Grover as Nikhil Malhotra: Rinki's former fiancé (2015)
Priya Shinde as Dr. Anita: Ishita's psychiatrist (2015)
Parveen Kaur as Aditi: a psychiatrist (2015)
Kanisha Malhotra as ACP Shalini (2015)
Asha Negi as Koyal Ghosh (2015)
Niyati Joshi as Shaila Vanraj: Omprakash's cousin; Neha's mother (2015)
Gulki Joshi as Neha Vanraj: Raman's cousin; Shaila's daughter (2015)
Anju Mahendru as Sujata Kumar: Lakshmi's mother (2015)
Arishfa Khan as Vinni (2015)
Ruchika Rajput as Vinni's mother (2015)
Gopal Singh as Chand Mishra (2015)
Abhilash Chaudhary as Mihika's friend (2015)
Navina Bole as Dimple: Nikhil's sister (2015)
Darshan Pandya as Prateek Sharma: Abhishek's friend (2015–2016)
Manoj Chandila as Dr. Manoj Paul (2015–2016)
Swati Kapoor as Sanchi (2016)
Avdeep Sidhu as Anil Nagpal: Raman's lawyer (2016)
Lalit Bisht as Amarnath Chaddha: Pallavi's husband (2016)
Garima Kapoor as Pallavi Chaddha: Amarnath's wife (2016)
Manish Khanna as Shyam Raichand (2016)
Zareena Roshan Khan as Ismail's mother (2016)
Kiran Bhargava as Shobhna Venkatesh: Upamanyu and Mani's mother; Aliya's grandmother.(2016–2017)
Pavitra Punia as Nidhi Chhabra: Raman and Ishita's nemesis; Sohail's sister (2016–2017)
Gaurav Wadhwa as Sohail Chhabra: Nidhi's brother; Ruhi's ex-lover (2016–2017)
Sid Makkar as Vidyut: Raman and Ishita's friend (2016–2017)
Deepak Wadhwa as Gaurav Bajaj: Simmi's ex-lover (2016–2017)
Anupama Solanki as Shweta: Raman's personal Secretary (2016–2019)
Benazir Shaikh as Divya: Abhishek's fiancé (2017)
Ribbhu Mehra as Nikhil: Ruhi's former lover (2017–2018)
Vidisha as Roshni Bhalla: Aditya's widow; Jr. Aditya's mother.  (2017–2018)
Gagan Anand as Gagan: Chandan's brother (2017)
Hritu Dudhani as Pooja: Nikhil's former wife (2017)
Drishti Hemdev as Riya: Nikhil and Pooja's daughter; Pihu's friend (2017)
Charu Mehra as Sonakshi Gupta/Aarushi Gupta (2018)
Sharat Sonu as Keshav Kumar Dalmiya (2018)
Ankit Bhatia as Sudha's lawyer (2018)
Dinesh Mehta as Vijender (2018)
Lankesh Bhardwaj as Police Inspector 
Varun Parashar as Dr. Rajat Srivastav: Sudha and Koko's brother (2018)
Abhishek Malik as Rohan Srivastav: Sudha's elder son; Karan's brother; Aliya's ex-husband (2018–2019)
Reyaansh Chaddha as Karan Srivastav: Sudha's younger son; Rohan's brother; Ruhi's husband (2018–2019)
Sudha Chandran as Sudha Srivastav: Koko and Rajat's sister; Rohan and Karan's mother (2018–2019)
Ajay Kumar Nain as Sahil Shah: Muskaan's brother; Shaina's husband; Samar's father (2019)
Hemaakshi Ujjain as Muskaan Shah: Sahil's sister (2019)
Mithil Jain as Arjit Saxena: Neeti's father (2019)
Chaitanya Choudhury as Shardul Sinha: Ishita's friend; Natasha's husband (2019)
Sapna Thakur as Natasha: Sunny's sister; Shardul's wife (2019)
Ansh Kukreja as Sunny: Natasha's brother (2019)

Guests
Hina Khan as Akshara Maheshwari Singhania from Yeh Rishta Kya Kehlata Hai (2014)
Shraddha Kapoor and Sidharth Malhotra for promoting Ek Villain  (2014) (special appearance) 
Deepika Padukone and Arjun Kapoor for promoting Finding Fanny (2014)
Vidya Balan as Vasudha for promoting Hamari Adhuri Kahani (2015)
Salman Khan for promoting Bajrangi Bhaijaan (2015)
Manasi Parekh as Maya for promoting Sumit Sambhal Lega (2015)
Tushar Kapoor and Aftab Shivdasani for promoting Kyaa Kool Hain Hum 3 (2016)
Emraan Hashmi for promoting Azhar (2016)
Ranbir Kapoor and Anushka Sharma for promoting Ae Dil Hai Mushkil (2016)
Devoleena Bhattacharjee for Dance Performance "Gopi" from Saath Nibhaana Saathiya (2016)
Deepika Singh Goyal for Dance Performance "Sandhya Rathi" from Diya Aur Baati Hum (2016)
Drashti Dhami  and Alka Amin for promoting their new show Pardes Mein Hai Meraa Dil (2016)
Arjun Kapoor and Shraddha Kapoor for promoting Half Girlfriend (2017)
Barun Sobti for promoting his new show Iss Pyaar Ko Kya Naam Doon 3
Mahima Makwana for promoting her show Rishton Ka Chakravyuh (2017)
Supriya Pathak for promoting her new show Khichdi Returns (2018)
Rani Mukerji for promoting her new movie Hichki (2018)
Mohit Sehgal as Himself (2018)
RJ Alok as Radio Jockey (2019)
Sargun Kaur Luthra as Dr. Preesha Srinivasan for promoting Yeh Hai Chahatein (2019)
Dipika Kakar Ibrahim as Sonakshi Rastogi from Kahaan Hum Kahaan Tum (2019)

Production

Development and premiere

Kapoor said, "I created Divyanka's character as a dentist in 'Yeh Hai Mohabbatein', as I was having a lot of tooth trouble those days. My dentist sorted my problems a lot, so I brought that character alive"

The show was first titled Custody and was initially based on Manju Kapur's 2011 novel Custody. It was renamed Mera Tera Rishta Purana which was again changed to Yeh Hai Mohabbatein. The production began about a year before its premiere but the launch was delayed due to creative differences and unavailability of time slot.

In November 2019, Ekta Kapoor revealed, "When I started Yeh Hai Mohabbatein, I remember going to Gaurav Banerjee from Star Plus and asking him for a non prime time slot because I wanted to do a show on a social issue. I had stopped doing much television and I wanted to make YHM without the trappings of a TRP driven show. A show about a woman who cannot have children, a stepmother who according to Indian terms is considered bad! Words in India like barren and evil stepmother got used so often and labelled women in the worst poss way. This show got so much love that it went on for six years. And from a non prime time slot to a prime time slot."

In September 2014, Deepika Padukone and Arjun Kapoor were to promote their film Finding Fanny in the series for which the leads Tripathi Dahiya and Patel had to shoot a sequence with them. As Patel delayed to the sets for shooting, the script was changed on Patel's absence at last minute as the films stars had to head on for other promotions.

On 11 May 2016, during filming of the wedding sequence of characters Romi and Mihika, the shoot was stalled owing to a fight between the production house and workers union. On 25 July 2018, the shoot was stalled for a while during bandh in Mumbai.

Casting

Divyanka Tripathi Dahiya was selected by Kapoor to play Ishita Iyer Bhalla. Cezanne Khan was first approached to play Raman Bhalla opposite Tripathi Dahiya, but was replaced by Karan Patel. Child artist Ruhanika Dhawan was chosen to play Ruhi Bhalla. Sayantani Ghosh was first considered but Anita Hassanandani was selected to play Shagun Arora. The other cast included then were  Aly Goni, Mihika Verma, Shruti Bapna, Neena Kulkarni, Shahnaz Rizwan, Kaushal Kapoor, Abhay Bhargava and Gautam Ahuja.

In March 2018, Charu Mehra was supposed to enter the series during the filming in London, however, she was unable due to her visa issues.

Filming

Based on backdrop of Delhi, the series is mainly filmed in Andheri, Mumbai. Some sequences were filmed abroad, including Australia, Budapest and London.

Spin-off

Yeh Hai Chahatein  premiered on 19 December 2019, replacing Yeh Hai Mohabbatein. It focuses on Ishita's niece Preesha portrayed by Sargun Kaur Luthra opposite Abrar Qazi portraying Preesha Khurana and Rudraksh Khurana respectively.

Adaptations

Awards and nominations

Reception
In spite of started airing at late night slot 11:00pm (IST), Yeh Hai Mohabbatein received better ratings than expected and even became fourth number on Star Plus. In 2014, on audience request, it got a dual slot of 7:30 p.m. and 11:00 p.m. (IST). Star Plus SVP marketing Nikhil Madhok stated that the move was made after audiences' feedback that a section of viewers found the 11:00 p.m. slot too late. He further explained, "This was a show where repeat viewing the next day or viewing on online digital medium is very high. So the dual airing will not only help the existing viewers who love the show to watch it twice but also add a whole new set of viewers".

In early 2016, it lost its steady position from top five, juggling in top ten weekly Hindi GEC list in weeks three to seven of the year where it garnered 10.47, 10.09, 10.95, 10.59 and 10.34 million impressions while in week five, it occupied third position. In week 29 of 2016 it garnered 10.022 million impressions occupying third position in Hindi GEC. In week 41, it was at fourth position with 9.687 million impressions.

Starting in January 2017, the show began to falter in the TRP ratings when the show's focus shifted to the new generation. Nevertheless, the show is very popular in the UK, being the most-watched Indian show. The climax of Ruhi-Nikhil track leading to Ananya's death brought a sudden spike in the ratings in the first week of November 2017 (week 44) and the series secured a place amongst the Top 10 shows after almost a year off this ranking. With the Budapest track and the focus back on the main leads, the show reached the Top 5 in the second week of November 2017 (week 45). In week 46 of the year 2017, the show further climbed to the fourth spot on the TRP chart, thus becoming the most-watched show on StarPlus. In week 47 of the year 2017, the show remained at  4 on the TRP charts and continued to be the most-watched show on StarPlus. The show continued to do well maintaining its No. 1 position on StarPlus in the following weeks. In week 51 of 2017, Yeh Hai Mohabbatein emerged as the most-watched show across all Hindi GECs. (General Entertainment Channels)

In week 8 of the year 2018, the show remained at  3 on the TRP charts and continued to be the most-watched show on STAR Plus. In May 2018, the show was shifted to 10:30 p.m. from 7:30 p.m. which led to a fall in TRPs. Roshni's baby track was received poorly by fans which led to a further downfall in TRPs following which the broadcaster, StarPlus, intervened asking the producer, Ekta Kapoor, to change the storyline of the show also giving it a 6-month deadline to increase the ratings. Ishita's fake death drama to expose Param led to the show re-entering the top 20 shows in week 31 of the year 2018 occupying 18th place with 3889 million viewership. After the change in show timings to late night TRPs have dropped ranging from 1.2 to 1.4 mostly but had been the slot leader since then. After being unable to pull up the TRP and lack of constructive story, the show went off air on 18 December 2019, giving space to a Ye Hai Mohobbatein spin-off called Ye Hai Chahatein.

References

External links
 

Balaji Telefilms television series
2013 Indian television series debuts
2019 Indian television series endings
Indian romance television series
Indian television soap operas
Serial drama television series
StarPlus original programming
Television shows based on Indian novels
Television shows set in Delhi